Xinchengpu town is a township-level division of Zhengding County, Shijiazhuang, Hebei, China.

Shijiazhuang Zhengding International Airport and Zhengding Airport Railway Station are located in this town next to the town-center.

See also
List of township-level divisions of Hebei

References

Township-level divisions of Hebei